Phryneta escalerai is a species of beetle in the family Cerambycidae. It was described by Báguena and Stephan von Breuning in 1958. It is known from Bioko.

References

Phrynetini
Beetles described in 1958